Zidan Amar (born 5 April 1992) is an Israeli-Druze footballer who currently plays at Maccabi Ahva Sha'ab.

Biography
As a child, he joined a local footballing school sponsored by Maccabi Tel Aviv in his home village, Julis, before moving to play for Hapoel Nazareth Illit's u-16 team. Two years later he transferred to Maccabi Haifa and played at the club's youth team, scoring 8 goals in his first season, helping the youth team winning the Israeli Noar Leumit League. Amar played a total of 23 matches in Israel's youth teams, scoring 5 goals 

As a senior player, Amar had stints in Hapoel Acre, Hakoah Amidar Ramat Gan and Maccabi Daliyat al-Karmel before returning to Beitar Nahariya at the beginning of 2014–15 season.

References

1992 births
Living people
Druze sportspeople
Israeli footballers
Hapoel Nof HaGalil F.C. players
Maccabi Haifa F.C. players
Hapoel Acre F.C. players
Hakoah Maccabi Amidar Ramat Gan F.C. players
Maccabi Daliyat al-Karmel F.C. players
Beitar Nahariya F.C. players
Maccabi Ahi Nazareth F.C. players
Hapoel Iksal F.C. players
Maccabi Bnei Reineh F.C. players
Israeli Premier League players
Liga Leumit players
Israeli Druze
Footballers from Julis
Association football forwards